Aankh Micholi (Blind Man's Bluff) is a Hindi social film. It was released in 1942. The music direction was by Gyan Dutt with lyrics written by Pandit Indra, Satyakam Sharma and Shatir Ghaznavi. The cast included Nalini Jaywant, Sulochana (Ruby Myers), Satish, Jilloobai, Hadi, Pratima Devi and Anand Prasad Kapoor.

Cast
 Nalini Jaywant
 Sulochana (Ruby Myers)
 Satish
 Jilloobai
 Hadi
 Pratima Devi
 A. P. Kapoor

Soundtrack
The music was composed by Gyan Dutt with lyrics by Pandit Indra Chandra, Satyakam Sharma and Shatir Ghaznavi. The singers were Leela Sawant, Nalini Jaywant, Rajkumari, Satish and Sumati Trilokekar

Song List

References

External links
 

1942 films
1940s Hindi-language films
Films scored by Gyan Dutt
Indian black-and-white films